Monroe Baker (born 1821 or 1823) is an American politician who served as mayor of St. Martinville, Louisiana, one of the earliest if not the first African-American mayor in the United States.

Biography
Baker was born in either 1821 (per the 1870 U.S. Census) or 1823 (per the 1850 U.S. Census) in St. Mary Parish, Louisiana and moved to St. Martinville, Louisiana. He is listed as a free black of mixed race descent and farmer was listed as his occupation. In 1867, he was appointed mayor of St. Martinville by Governor Benjamin Flanders after the death of mayor Pierre Gary. He served for approximately one year. In the 1870 Census, he was listed as a "livery stable keeper" and by 1891, he was listed as "an enterprising citizen and successful planter".

In 1845, he married Mary L. Barrier and they had 12 children. Sources indicate that he had a second wife named Clotide with whom he had five children and it is surmised that he had twelve children between his two wives.

References 

1820s births
African-American mayors in Louisiana
19th-century African-American politicians
19th-century American politicians